Port Colborne Airport  is located  west of Port Colborne, Ontario, Canada.

References

Registered aerodromes in Ontario
Transport in Port Colborne